Minerva is the Internet username of a "netizen" who wrote about the Korean economy and the economic policies of the Korean government.  Minerva's writing evoked the ire of the Korean government, when an entry precipitated a run on the South Korean won.  Prosecutors  arrested a man they claim to be Minerva, Park Dae-sung, and charged him with the crime of electronically spreading false rumors that damage the public good.  The true identity of Minerva, however, remains to be established.  The arrest has also drawn international scrutiny.  Minerva posted articles in Daum Agora, one of the largest Internet debate bulletin boards in South Korea, from March 2008 to January 2009.

Minerva has successfully predicted major events in the Korean economy and was quick to provide solutions for both the government and households.  Despite his warnings, the Korean government's economic policies remained controversial, with Minerva becoming one of the most influential critics of the government's policies.  It was under this background that Minerva became known as "the Internet Economic President." Among the famous predictions Minerva has made were: the collapse of Lehman Brothers and its potential consequences, and the sharp decline of South Korean currency value against the U.S. dollar at specified time points.

Famous postings

Objection against KDB's takeover of Lehman Brothers Holdings

Minerva expressed concerns over the planned takeover of Lehman Brothers Holdings, Inc. by the Korean Development Bank (KDB).  This was well before the financial instability of the US investment bank was known to the public.

Arrest of Minerva

On January 7, 2009, prosecutors arrested a suspect believed to be Minerva for "spreading false rumors on the Internet".  The prosecutors announced the anonymous blogger economist was a 30-year-old unemployed man.

An article was posted by Minerva on December 29, 2008, in the economy section of Daum Agora bulletin boards.  The article claimed that the Korean government issued an urgent directive to major financial companies and explicitly mentioned a ban on purchase of U.S. dollars.  The Korean Ministry of Strategy and Finance quickly made a statement denying any such move from the government.  The Agora post was initially screened from viewing by Daum and was later removed by the author.  Minerva responded with an apology for the article.
  
It was that article that prosecutors are said to be motivated to arrest Minerva.  They have regarded it as a false rumor.

Original text is:

Translation of the text is:

Acquittal and government appeal
On April 20, 2009 Park Dae-sung was acquitted and released from jail. The reasoning of the court was that if any of the statements he made were false, he did not know they were false.

However, South Korean law allows the prosecution to appeal the acquittal, and they are doing so. The appeal is expected to be ruled upon in the winter of 2009–10.

Controversy

Arrest and freedom of expression

There are many doubts and criticisms surrounding the arrest.  For example, the law (Electronic Communication Fundamental Law) Minerva is known to have violated is possibly unconstitutional.

Minbyun, Korean Lawyers for a Democratic Society argued that though it is about the criminal penalty, the clause is vague, which is against the Law of Clearance, meaning that the law about crime must be clearly declared for people to understand it, derived from Nulla poena sine lege, thus this clause is probably unconstitutional. And Korea University Lawschool Professor Park Kyung-Sin said "The most effective way to oppose rumors, which seem false, is not punishment to the speaker, but ensurance of the freedom of expression."

Many people doubt whether the writings of Minerva are obviously false. There is evidence indicating that the government did control the exchange rate.

Lee Seok-Hyeon, a congressman of Democratic Party, argued that the government actually did request banks to restrain from buying dollars. According to him, the Ministry of Strategy and Finance called staff members of the seven main banks into a meeting at the Korea Federation of Banks in Myeong-dong on December 26, 2008. In the meeting, the authority asked them for self-restraint in purchasing dollars. Lee Seok-Hyeon said he heard this directly from a man who was at the meeting.

Foreign bloggers writing about Korea have cast doubt about the government's handling of the opinionated blogger. Some express concerns that this would mean demise of freedom of speech in Korea.

Maeil Business Newspaper Minerva

On November 11, 2008, Maeil Business Newspaper quoted a government intelligence source on the identity of Minerva. The intelligence representative has been quoted as saying that "the government needed to provide Minerva with correct information and statistics" as the reason for looking up his identity. The source said Minerva is an individual in early 50s who has worked overseas in the stock market business. Minerva subsequently announced that he will no longer post anything on the economy saying that "the country ordered silence".

readme's Minerva

There has been a Daum Agora poster claiming to be a distant acquaintance of Minerva's.  The reference "Minerva K" comes from his posting, where "K" is an alphabetical equivalent of a binary ASCII code Minerva has left in one of his postings.  Readme's posting made a wave when he asserted that Minerva is a well-known and influential figure in the South Korean financial circles.

Shin DongA's Minerva K

Shin DongA, a current event magazine of the DongA Ilbo newspaper published two articles from the purported Minerva.  In the first article Minerva summarized his previous postings in Daum Agora.  In the second article, following the arrest of Park, he claims "Minerva" is in fact a small group of people in the financial business who are concerned with the nation's economy.  Shin DongA's Minerva claimed that Park has been unknown to his group and discredited Park, saying that he revealed serious lack of basic knowledge.

Although the reference to "K" gets reiterated in Shin DongA's articles, readme retorted their version Minerva is a pure fiction.  Park, the arrestee, stated he never wrote for Shin DongA.  The prosecutors, however, announced that they have no plan to investigate Shin DongA's "Minerva K".

On February 17, 2009, the DongA Ilbo published an apology saying that their Minerva K was not the famous Daum Agora writer and the details are still under investigation.

Park Dae-sung

All postings by Minerva come from two IP addresses and a single log-on ID.  The prosecutors say they can single out only one person that matches this criterion.  Shortly after the arrest, the prosecutors let Park write a short essay on this year's economic perspective.  He produced a one-page report which the prosecutors found professionally written.  Others pointed out a number of faults in basic knowledge and lack of style.  Particularly erroneous was his observation on the growth rate of the Chinese economy, which he expected to become negative in 2009.

The prosecutors also tested Park's knowledge by asking a handful of financial jargons he has used in his postings: 1) Tobin's q, 2) BDI and freight rates, 3) the LTCM crisis in 1998, 4) spread, 5) offshore NDF market, and 6) trickle down. According to the prosecutors, he did not remember Tobin's q but answered to most of questions. He was able to provide lengthy answers to questions 2 and 3.

In February 2009, South Korea's TV broadcaster SBS (Seoul Broadcasting System) has aired an investigative special on Minerva.  They gave Park a written test similar to the prosecutors'.  The questions were: 1) dynamic hedging, 2) yen carry trade and cross trade, 3) BDI and freight rates, 4) spread (between onshore and) offshore NDF markets, 5) 01001011, a binary code he left in a posting on his identity in November 2008. Park only answered to questions 3) and 4) in an unsatisfactory way, according to a commentator Damdamdangdang in Daum Agora. In the show, SBS concluded nonetheless that Park is the true Minerva.

Chronology of events

 2008-3: Minerva, starts to post in Economics discussions bulletin in Daum's "Agora"
 2008-7-14:  Minerva, "Households should better prepare for commodity price rises" predicts the heavy impact on Korean households of USA's sub-prime Mortgage Crisis.
 2008-8-25: Minerva, "Korean Development Bank has to consider toxic assets that amounts to 50billion KRW" objects to the acquisition of Lehman Brothers by Korean Development Bank. (Lehman shares tumbled over 90% on September 15, 2008)
 2008-8-29: Minerva, predicts rise of KRW against USD to 1125 in mid September, 1180~1200 in end of September.
 2008-9-18: Minerva, "short cover securities, because KOSPI will fall to 1210~1235". (KOSPI was at that time 1392)
 2008-10-6: Minerva, predicts that KRW may surge to 1400 without Korea-US currency swap (KRW went over 1400 against USD in the end of October)
 2008-11-3: Minister of Justice, mentioned possible investigation of "Minerva"
 2008-11-11: Press report "Minerva is supposed to be a man in early 50s with experience with securities company, having lived and worked overseas," quoting an intelligence agency.
 2008-11-13: Minerva, announces s/he will stop posting.
 2008-11-16: The Union of Citizens for a Democratic Press, award Minerva a Prize
 2008-11-17: KBS, Current Affairs 360, broadcast a programme, 'Why, Minerva is a phenomenon?'
 2008-11-18: Professor Kim, Tae Dong, makes an apology regarding the interview with Sisa360 (a TV program about current affairs), saying that the interview with himself was distorted by the producer.
 2008-12:  Shin DongA, a magazine affiliated with DongA Ilbo, published "Minerva"'s contribution arguing that it contacted him secretly. Park Dae-sung denied he has ever contacted Sin DongA
 2008-12-24: A staff of Ministry of Strategy and Finance admitted to reporters that he asked for "support" of major importers, exporter, state owned enterprises, and financial institutions.
 2008-12-29: Minerva posted on the government intervention, hinting that households, small and medium enterprises, should utilize this opportunity to profit from changing foreign exchange rates.
 2009-1-5: Minerva's last posting, "We should rely on hope"
 2009-1-7: Minerva arrested by the Prosecutors
 2009-1-8: Ministry of Strategy and Finance denies intervening in the criminal prosecution of "Minerva" in a press release
 2009-1-8: Prosecutors indict "Minerva" .
 2009-4-20: Park Dae-sung was acquitted and released from jail

See also
 Constitution of the Republic of Korea

Notes

References

External links
 Economist, False God?/online Nostradamus, and the search for his identity
Financial Times, Financial blogger arrested in South Korea
AFP, South Korea's arrested Internet pundit pleads not guilty
Minerva's writings (collected by Collecting Writings of Daum Agora Minerva) (Minerva writings were all deleted. But the internet community collected his writings and made 4 PDF files which can be freely downloaded.)
Download: Vol.1, Vol.2, Vol.3, Vol.4.

Living people
1978 births
People from Seoul
Internet activists
South Korean Internet celebrities
South Korean activists
South Korean bloggers
Economy of South Korea
Politics of South Korea
Anonymous bloggers
Kakao